Typha tzvelevii is a plant species endemic to the Primorye region of the Russian Far East. It grows in wet places.

References

tzvelevii
Aquatic plants
Flora of Russia
Plants described in 2002